Susani Violet Mathye is a South African politician who has represented the African National Congress (ANC) in the Limpopo Provincial Legislature since 2014. She was first elected to the provincial legislature in the 2014 general election, ranked 26th on the ANC's provincial party list. She was ranked 14th upon her re-election in the 2019 general election.

Simultaneously, Mathye served as Regional Deputy Chairperson of the ANC's branch in Mopani between 2013 and 2021. She was elected comfortably to the position in November 2013, beating Norman Machete with 102 votes against Machete's 66, and she was re-elected in September 2017. She deputised Regional Chairpersons Seaparo Sekoati (from 2013 to 2017) and Pule Shayi from (2017 to 2021). At the party's next regional elective conference in June 2021, Mathye did not stand for re-election and was succeeded by Gerson Molapisane. She was also elected to two consecutive four-year terms on the Limpopo ANC's Provincial Executive Committee in June 2018 and June 2022.

References

External links 

 

Living people
Year of birth missing (living people)
Members of the Limpopo Provincial Legislature
African National Congress politicians
21st-century South African politicians
21st-century South African women politicians
Women members of provincial legislatures of South Africa